Aeroflot Flight 6709 was a Tupolev Tu-154B on a domestic route from Baku to Leningrad on 19 May 1978. While cruising, fuel starvation affected the flow of fuel to the aircraft's three Kuznetsov NK-8 engines, causing the engines to stop. This issue was possibly as a result of poor aircraft design.

Accident details
Aeroflot Flight 6709 took off from Bina International Airport at 10:30 a.m. MSK. Roughly two hours into the flight, the engines lost power. Some sources state that this was due to an accidental shutoff of fuel pumping to the aircraft's sump tank by the flight engineer, though the accuracy of this claim is uncertain. Due to the poor design of the Tu-154B, a single fuel pump failure could result in the stoppage of all three engines. Soon after the engines lost power, the aircraft's AC generators stopped. This resulted in an abrupt pitch and roll of the aircraft, the first sign of malfunction that the pilots noticed. 

During descent, the pilots tried multiple times to restart the engines. Some of these attempts worked, but did not supply enough power to the generators to restart the fuel pump. The pilots also attempted to use the aircraft's auxiliary power unit (APU) to restart the fuel pump, but its operation was disabled by design at altitudes above .

The aircraft bounced several times, separating into three pieces upon contact with trees. Two to three minutes after stopping, the aircraft's fuselage caught fire and was destroyed. The crash and resulting fire caused 4 fatalities and 27 injuries.

References

1978 in the Soviet Union
Accidents and incidents involving the Tupolev Tu-154
6709
Airliner accidents and incidents caused by engine failure
Airliner accidents and incidents caused by fuel starvation
Airliner accidents and incidents caused by pilot error
Aviation accidents and incidents in 1978
Aviation accidents and incidents in the Soviet Union
May 1978 events in Asia